High School Affiliated to Yangzhou University is a high school affiliated to Yangzhou University in Jiangsu Province, China. It is located at Huaihai Road, Yangzhou (beside the Slender West Lake). The school was established in 1951.

Buildings

References

External links

 

High schools in Jiangsu
Yangzhou University
Educational institutions established in 1951
1951 establishments in China
Yangzhou